The 2010 Commonwealth Games Village was the athletes' residence for the 2010 Commonwealth Games in New Delhi.

Facilities

Residential zone 

The Village has 14 blocks, 34 towers and 1,168 air-conditioned flats built by Emaar. It is divided into four zones:

 Warli (Red)
 Gond (Blue)
 Madhubani (Green)
 Sanjhi (Purple)

It also includes the CGA office spaces, the Polyclinic and the Casual Dining.

After the games, Emaar has the rights to sell 66% of the luxury apartments, which will be sold for Rs 18–42 million each (U$387,000-U$903,000)

International zone
The International Zone includes retail shops, TV lounge, games room, internet café, village bar etc. The International Zone also includes the Guest Pass Centre, the VIP Waiting Area, the Chefs de Mission Meeting Hall, the Mayor's Office, and the Media Center.

Training area 
There are training areas for Athletics, Aquatics, Weightlifting/Para-sport Powerlifting and Wrestling. There is an eight-lane 400 m Synthetic athletics track and an Olympic-size swimming pool. It also has gymnasium and fitness centre, steam and sauna facilities, physiotherapy rooms.

Dining 

The Dining area has the capacity to accommodate 2,300 of the total residents. During the Games, the main dining service was opened 24 hours and provided free meal service.

Operational zone
 Access Control Point
 Vehicles Check Point
 Village Operations Centre
 Security Command Centre
 Workforce Centre
 Waste Management Compound
 Transport Mall
 Village Arrivals and Departures Accreditation Centre (VADAC).

Operational Zone I is located adjacent to the Training Area, while Operational Zone II is adjacent to the Residential Zone.

Transportation
There are two free transport systems in the Games Village – the Internal Village Shuttle and the Bus Service. Customised cart and golf carts will also be available for Internal movement.

Other features
 Wi Fi service all around the Games village
 The Village is classified as a non-smoking zone.

Location
The games village is located near Akshardham Temple and Pandav Nagar in New Delhi on the banks of the River Yamuna.

Controversy
Weeks before the opening ceremony Michael Fennell, the Commonwealth Games Federation president, wrote to the Indian cabinet secretary urging action in response to the village being "seriously compromised." He said that though team officials were impressed with the international zone and main dining area, they were "shocked" by the state of the accommodation. "The village is the cornerstone of any Games and the athletes deserve the best possible environment to prepare for their competition."

New Zealand, Scotland, Canada and Northern Ireland demanded that their teams be put up in hotels if their accommodation is not ready.

The England and Wales teams travelled to Delhi on 23 September 2010, following satisfactory progress of improvement works at the village. The Scotland Team travelled on 25 September 2010.

Security

 Perimeter security
 CCTV in basement and main entrance lobby for surveillance
 Video door phone at main door in every apartment.
2.1 Common Wealth Games Village, New Delhi

The Commonwealth Games 2010 is being scheduled to be held in the capital city of New Delhi. The games village was accommodated by the players during the games and is now occupied by individual private home-owners. A 47.3 hectare (118 acre) picturesque site has been selected on the banks of holy river Yamuna for the purpose of construction of the games village. The project site is within the immediate vicinity of heritage monuments and historical landmarks, combined with dense green natural covers on the sides.

2.1.1 Site and landscape
The proposed development consists of 4000 bedrooms spread across 34 towers varying in heights (such as; 7 to 9 storeys high). The proposed apartment's blocks are arranged in site in a way so as to create visual links with heritage sites in the vicinity. The topsoil of the entire excavated site has been collected and stored separately and special measures have been taken for soil stabilisation, such as- stockpiling, mulching, and so on. Pervious paving has been provided extensively in the site . All the service lines and utility corridors on the site are well aggregated and ensure minimum disruption during future maintenance work.

2.1.2 Health and well-being
The sanitation/safety facilities for the construction workers are provided as per National Building Code 2005. These include provision of clean and hygienic accommodation, toilet facilities, purified drinking water, general store, a subsidised canteen, medical facilities, day care centre and onsite safety equipment, and so on. Significant measures have been taken to reduce air pollution during construction, such as – site roads are regularly sprayed with water; wheels of all vehicles are washed, and so on.

2.1.3 Water
Water efficient landscaping is being practised to minimise post construction water usage. This is being done by providing native species, efficient irrigation systems and by limiting lawn areas. The building water consumption also has been reduced by use of high efficiency low-flow fixtures. The construction water management on site is very efficient in terms of reuse of waste water and less utilisation of potable water in construction.

2.1.4 Building design and energy
The building design has also included the existing site features, such as, the visual linkages with historical monuments, solar geometry, and so on. Due to high density planning requirements, the design did not permit optimum orientation for all apartment blocks. As a result, the apartment blocks have equal exposure towards all cardinal directions. However, the critical facades are shaded and have high performance glazing to negate impact of direct incident radiation. The buildings are fully compliant with the Energy Conservation Building Code 2007. Several energy efficiency measures such as roof insulation, high performance glazing, energy efficient lighting and variable refrigerant volume (VRV) based air conditioning system have been provided to reduce the energy consumption of the apartments significantly.

2.1.5 Renewable energy
Solar photo voltaic system is proposed to meet the 10% of total energy requirements for internal lighting. 31% of outdoor lighting is provided through solar energy. Solar hot water systems are provided to meet part of water heating needs.

2.1.6 Other features
Waste water recycling and solid waste management for the entire campus are being planned by the Delhi Jal Board at a macro level for the village as well as adjoining

See also
 2010 Commonwealth Games
 Concerns and controversies over the 2010 Commonwealth Games

References

External links
 BBC photos illustrating the Athletes' village construction controversy
 Official site

Village
2010 Commonwealth Games Village
Buildings and structures in New Delhi